The Salvador River is a river of Paraíba state in northeastern Brazil. It starts near Sapé and flows into Paraíba do Norte River near Santa Rita, Paraíba.

See also
List of rivers of Paraíba

References
Brazilian Ministry of Transport

Rivers of Paraíba